The Cobb & Co Museum is at 27 Lindsay Street, Toowoomba, Queensland, Australia.

History 
The museum was originally established to house The Cobb & Co. Collection of W. R. F. Bolton consisting of over thirty 19th century horse-drawn vehicles which he collected and had restored over a period of more than thirty years. This Collection also includes over one hundred artifacts, comprising saddles, machinery, tools, and items of domestic and occupational use. The expansion of the museum over time, with the addition and consolidation of other collections, has led to the museum becoming internationally recognised as housing The National Carriage Collection.

The Collection was originally on display in Toowoomba at the premises of Cobb & Co. Limited, Mr Bolton's road transport company, from 1965 until 1981. Jenny Cardell, Mr Bolton's daughter, and her husband, Adrian Cardell, purchased the Collection through their company Banks Pty. Ltd. in 1980. They then entered into protracted negotiations with the Queensland Government to donate the Collection to the Queensland Museum on the condition that the Collection would be housed at Toowoomba in a purpose-built building.

A formal Deed of Gift which provided that the museum would attempt to develop the Museum in the longer term as a specialized branch of the Queensland Museum in the Eastern Darling Downs area for the benefit of the people in the area from which the Collection was largely drawn was finally entered into in 1982. The museum also gave its assurance that the Collection will be regarded as a memorial to Mr. W. R. F. Bolton and the pioneers of transportation in the State of Queensland and that, in the light of that objective, the museum will treat the necessity to preserve the Collection intact as its primary responsibility.

Pursuant to the provisions of the Deed of Gift the Queensland Museum opened the Cobb & Co. Museum to display the Collection in 1987. A decision was subsequently made to augment the Collection by relocating the Queensland Museum's own collection of 19th century vehicles then held at Brisbane.

The popularity of the Cobb & Co. Museum led to a second stage being added to the existing Museum to create a space to display the history of Toowoomba and the Darling Downs. The refurbished Cobb & Co. Museum also allowed space to house the Museum Resource Centre for Southern Queensland.

An $8 million redevelopment of the museum was undertaken in 2010, with $2 million being subscribed by public donations. The extensions included the construction of a custom designed Factory area to house facilities for a range of heritage trades. Several additional galleries were added at this point, some of which house a range of temporary exhibits. One and two-day workshops in heritage trades including blacksmithing, silversmithing, stonemasonry, millinery, leather crafting, felting, glass art, calligraphy, leather plaiting, and creative bookmaking are conducted throughout the year.

The museum now houses over 50 horse-drawn vehicles, including sturdy drays and farm wagons, that tell the story of European settlement on the Darling Downs, while sulkies and buggies demonstrate transportation imported to Australia during the 1880s. Elaborate Phaetons, Victoria Carriages, and a Landau, said to have been owned by a governor of Queensland, give a glimpse of the times when life's pace was a little slower. Three original Cobb & Co. coaches, including the last coach that ran from Yuleba to Surat in 1924, complete the collection.

Cobb & Co. coach No. 100 is of particular interest. In 1963 Mr. Bolton arranged at his personal cost, the longest coach journey ever undertaken, a re-enactment of a Cobb & Co. coach trip from Port Douglas to Melbourne via the inland route. Donations were raised for the Royal Flying Doctor Service, and passengers were taken on board the coach during the journey, paying a fee for travel. The Royal Flying Doctor Service received over £26,000, the gross proceeds of the event.

See also
Cobb & Co

List of museums

References

External links
 Cobb & Co Museum website

Transport museums in Queensland
Buildings and structures in Toowoomba
Carriage museums
1987 establishments in Australia